The 1913 College Basketball All-American team, as chosen retroactively by the Helms Athletic Foundation. The player highlighted in gold was chosen as the Helms Foundation College Basketball Player of the Year retroactively in 1944.

See also
 1912–13 NCAA men's basketball season

References

NCAA Men's Basketball All-Americans
All-Americans